Carex berteroniana is a species of sedge native to the Juan Fernández Islands.

References 

berteroniana
Flora of the Juan Fernández Islands